Sean Knight (born 10 July 1969) is a Barbadian boxer. He competed in the men's lightweight event at the 1988 Summer Olympics.

References

External links
 

1969 births
Living people
Barbadian male boxers
Olympic boxers of Barbados
Boxers at the 1988 Summer Olympics
Place of birth missing (living people)
Lightweight boxers